Parvati Arga Bird Sanctuary is situated in the Gonda District and about 45 Km. from Gonda at Mankapur-Nawabganj Road and Mankapur-Faizabad Railway Line in the state of Uttar Pradesh, India. The sanctuary is spread over an area of 1084.47 ha. The lake is naturally able to sustain resident birds throughout the year and migratory birds during winter season. It was a part of the Saryu River. As the river changed its flow path these lakes were left as its remains. Thus, both the lakes are oxbow lakes. Parvati Arga Bird Sanctuary was declared vide Government. Notification No. 1021/14-3-14/90 dated 23.05.1990.  The sanctuary consists of two lakes i.e. Parvati and Arga situated about 1.5 Km. apart. Tikri Reserve Forest falling under jurisdiction of Gonda Forest Division is at about 1 Km. The nearest town is Wajeerganj which is at a distance of 12 km from the Sanctuary.

Setting
The sanctuary includes two oxbow lakes, Parvati Tal and Arga Tal, and covers and area of 10.84 square kilometers.

Flora and fauna
Parvati Arga Bird Sanctuary is in the Upper Gangetic Plains moist deciduous forests ecoregion.

The avian population of the bird sanctuary is a mix of about 35 species of resident as well as migratory birds.

The birds migrate across Himalayas from Tibet, China, Europe and Siberia during winters. Some of these birds fly over 5000 km and above 8500 meters high to reach here.

Some of the major migratory birds during the season are greylag goose, northern pintail, cotton teal, red-crested pochard, gadwall, northern shoveler, Eurasian coot and mallard.

Some major local migratory and residential birds are sarus crane, painted stork, Indian peafowl, white ibis, little grebe, fulvous whistling duck, Asian openbill, white-necked stork, pheasant-tailed jacana, bronze winged jacana, grey-headed swamphen, northern lapwing, black drongo and Indian roller.

History
Parvati Arga was declared a bird sanctuary on 23 May 1990. Prior to that it was under the fisheries department.

On March 22, 2021, the Union Ministry declared that Ramsar Convention had added 15 more sites from India, which includes Parvati Arga. Today, there are 42 Ramsar sites in the country.

References

Bird sanctuaries of Uttar Pradesh
Ramsar sites in India
Gonda district
1990 establishments in Uttar Pradesh
Protected areas established in 1990